Max von Zedtwitz (born in Switzerland) is a scholar of global R&D and innovation with a focus on emerging countries. He is Managing Director of GLORAD, a research network with locations in China, the United States, Brazil and Europe, and professor at universities in Europe and China.

Scientific work
Von Zedtwitz's work is at the intersection of international business, innovation, and R&D Management. With collaborator Oliver Gassmann, he proposed a widely used behavioral model of evolution of global R&D organization based on internal organizational tension. He and Gassmann also formulated a supply-and-demand model for innovation globalization based external drivers, namely access to markets and access to technology. In managerial writings, he outlined support mechanisms appropriate to lead global innovation teams within such R&D organizations.

Early to study R&D in China, he co-developed theory of reverse innovation and innovation in emerging countries, both inbound R&D investments and management of innovation in China and outbound internationalization of R&D by Chinese firms. In this context, he refined organizational growth models for individual units as well as networks of units. He also contributed to the theory of global R&D flows, pharmaceutical innovation, and business incubator management.

Awards
 2009 IAMOT Award for Research Excellence (top-50 researcher worldwide in technology management)
 Winner of the 2015 Thomas P. Hustad Prize for best paper in the Journal of Product Innovation Management

Selected publications

von Zedtwitz, M.; Birkinshaw, J.; Gassmann, O. (2008, Editors): Management of International Research and Development. Edgar Elgar: Cheltenham.
Boutellier, R.; Gassmann, O.; von Zedtwitz, M. (2008): Managing Global Innovation – Uncovering the Secrets of Future Competitiveness. 3rd ed. Springer: Heidelberg.

See also
R&D Management
Global R&D management

References

External links
Max von Zedtwitz at GLORAD
Max von Zedtwitz at University of St. Gallen
Publications through Google Scholar

1969 births
Living people
Swiss academics
Academic staff of the Kaunas University of Technology
University of St. Gallen alumni
ETH Zurich alumni
Place of birth missing (living people)